Ceyx was a figure in Greek mythology, also included in Ovid's Metamorphoses.

Ceyx may also refer to:

Ceyx (bird), a genus of kingfishers named for the Greek figure
Ceyx (Neopaganism), a neopagan god named for the Greek figure
Ceyx (father of Hippasus), an unrelated figure in Greek mythology, ally to Heracles